Leila Meskhi (born 5 January 1968) is a retired Georgian professional tennis player.

Meskhi has won five singles and doubles titles on the WTA Tour. She has also won one singles and two doubles titles on the ITF Women's Circuit. On 5 August 1991, she reached her best singles ranking of world No. 12. On 10 April 1995, she peaked at No. 21 in the WTA doubles rankings.

Her best performance at a Grand Slam tournament came when she got to the quarterfinals of the 1990 US Open, defeating Akiko Kijimuta, Natasha Zvereva, Katia Piccolini and Linda Ferrando before losing to eventual champion Gabriela Sabatini in straight sets.

WTA career finals

Singles: 11 (5 titles, 6 runner-ups)

Doubles: 12 (5 titles, 7 runner-up)

ITF finals

Singles (1–0)

Doubles (2-0)

Grand Slam performance timeline

Singles

External links
 
 
 
 

1968 births
Living people
French Open junior champions
Female tennis players from Georgia (country)
Olympic bronze medalists for the Unified Team
Olympic tennis players of the Soviet Union
Olympic tennis players of the Unified Team
Sportspeople from Tbilisi
Soviet female tennis players
Tennis players at the 1988 Summer Olympics
Tennis players at the 1992 Summer Olympics
Olympic medalists in tennis
Honoured Masters of Sport of the USSR
Medalists at the 1992 Summer Olympics
Universiade medalists in tennis
Universiade gold medalists for the Soviet Union
Grand Slam (tennis) champions in girls' doubles
Medalists at the 1987 Summer Universiade